Deh Zarchi (also Romanized as Deh Zārchī; also known as Zārchī) is a village in Kiskan Rural District, in the Central District of Baft County, Kerman Province, Iran. At the 2006 census, its population was 118, in 36 families.

References 

Populated places in Baft County